The PSX is a Sony digital video recorder with a fully integrated PlayStation 2 home video game console. It was released in Japan on December 13, 2003. Since it was designed to be a general-purpose consumer video device, it was marketed by the main Sony Corporation instead of Sony Computer Entertainment and does not carry the usual PlayStation branding. Initial sales were strong, with the console selling 100,000 units during its first week, thus selling out. Its high cost, however, resulted in poor sales later on, prompting Sony to cancel plans to release the PSX outside Japan. After the price had been lowered in September 2004, sales increased again.

Features
The device is a fully functional digital video recorder with an included Infrared remote control and S-Video, composite video, and RF inputs. It is able to tune analog VHF and CATV. It can also be linked with a PlayStation Portable to transfer photos, videos and music via USB ports, and features software for non-linear video editing, image editing and audio editing. DVD+R support was to be introduced in a future update.

It was the first device to use Sony's XrossMediaBar (XMB) graphical user interface, which was later used on the PlayStation Portable, PlayStation 3, some Blu-ray Disc players, and 2008-era BRAVIA TVs. Like standard PS2 consoles, the PSX can be laid horizontally or stood up vertically.

The PSX fully supports both PlayStation and PlayStation 2 software by its slot-loading DVD drive, as the onboard EE+GS chip is a unification of the PS2's Emotion Engine and Graphics Synthesizer chips. Online game compatibility is available using the broadband connection; Games that use the PS2 HDD (such as Final Fantasy XI) are supported as well.

Shortly before release, Sony omitted numerous features from the PSX, citing that it was necessary to launch by Christmas 2003 time. Playback of CD-R and DVD+RW discs for example were dropped, as well as MP3 format audio, and instead DVD-RW discs and ATRAC format audio were retained upon release. However, firmware updates (versions 1.10 and 1.20) added these features later on.

Peripherals
The PSX is compatible with all first-party PlayStation and PlayStation 2 controllers and memory cards, with the exception of the PocketStation. The main unit has two controller ports located on the back side and two memory card slots on the front side hidden behind a panel cover. While the unit itself was sold without a game controller, a PSX-branded variant of the DualShock 2 analog controller was sold separately which features a 4-meter long cord (a bit longer than the standard versions of the controller). Because of the different placement of controller ports and memory card slots (which are located above each other on standard PlayStation and PlayStation 2 consoles), the PSX is incompatible with all versions of the multitap, and no PSX-specific multitap was ever made to get around this issue. Games that require the use of two or more USB ports are also incompatible with the PSX.

Retail configurations
The PSX was released in eight retail configurations during its lifespan; the 5000 series (with an embossed logo on top and grey stripe at the back) shipped with 160 GB Hard disk drives, while the 7000 series (with a colored logo on top and black stripe at the back) contained 250 GB drives. Software updates were made available by disc and download.

The 7500/7700 models added a Ghost Reduction Tuner. The inclusion of BS and UHF/VHF connectors varied by model. Starting with firmware version 2.10, users could export videos to a Memory Stick. The exported files are compatible for playback on the PSP. This feature is unavailable on earlier models due to the later firmware versions never being released for them. Contrary to popular belief, no variant of this console supports PSP games or is compatible with UMD discs.

All models have two sets of status LEDs and Infrared receivers; one along the front for horizontal orientation, and a second strip along the top-back for vertical orientation. The 'Disk Rec' indicator is only on the front of the device in later models. Additionally, some models have one or two decorative blue LED light strips, either on the front located under the disc slot or in the back. DESR-5XXX consoles have a solid white case with an embossed PSX logo (except DESR-5100S, which has a silver case). DESR-7XXX consoles have a clear-white case with a colored PSX logo printed on.

Etymology
Up until the release of the PlayStation 2, the first PlayStation console came to be known colloquially outside of Japan by its provisional codename of PSX (this was adopted to echo the MSX, a home computer standard sold by Sony and other companies throughout the 1980s). This can cause some confusion as to which device is being referred to.

Colors
The PSX was initially displayed at CEATEC in white, silver, yellow, red and blue. The white variant was released commercially, with a limited edition silver model made available in 2004.

See also
Panasonic Q

References

External links
 

Digital video recorders
Sony consoles
Sixth-generation video game consoles
PlayStation (console)
PlayStation 2
Products introduced in 2003
Discontinued video game consoles
Japan-only video game hardware
PlayStation (brand)